The Creole garden or  (hut garden) is a multi-strata, multi-use agroforestry system common in French Guiana, the West Indies and Réunion, intended for the production of fruit and vegetables and characterised by the association of a large diversity of different plant species, forming several vegetation layers, from herbaceous plants to trees. It blends Amerindian civilisation with the history of European colonisation; of plots given to enslaved people to support themselves, self-sufficient Maroon settlements and of Chinese and Indian immigration to the West Indes, all of which contribute to the form and purpose of the garden.

It includes field and garden areas: horticultural crops are grown inside the fence and field crops outside. Common cultivation techniques include hand-watering, composting, mulching, pruning, use of trellises and simple protection measures from livestock. It can provide fruits, vegetables and herbs for the household, but also medicinal products, fodder for animals, as well as commodities such as wooden poles or bamboo.

The Creole garden is often presented as a model for designing productive and environmentally friendly agroecosystems, for example in the context of agroecology, or ecological intensification. The coexistence of many species with similar utility in the garden stabilises production and spreads risk.

Haiti 
This cropping system continues to make an important contribution to small-scale farming in mountain areas, as the country experiences significant ecological, economic and social pressure. Jardin lakou have a high species diversity, and provide support to food self-sufficiency on Haitian mountain farms.

Réunion 

Sometimes richly decorated and perforated, it allows passers-by to observe the property.

There are also a number of outdoor cooking areas, a wash house and animal shelters. The front of the garden may be planted with pineapple flowers, anthuriums, hibiscus, bougainvillea, Aloe Vera, Rose Geranium, Basil, Curry tree and Kaffir lime. A greenhouse is sometimes dedicated to orchids. Although this type of garden is tending to disappear with the increasing urbanisation of Réunion, it continues to be echoed in urban homes, in the organisation of terraces, and smaller front and back yards, using potted plants.

References 

Agriculture
WikiProject Overseas France articles
Types of garden
Creole culture
Agroecology
Agroforestry systems